"Shadows Tremble" was an American television movie that was broadcast on October 23, 1958, as part of the CBS television series, Playhouse 90.

Plot
Toymaker Oscar Bromek, an immigrant, retires to a small town in Vermont where he struggles to fit in.

Cast
The cast included the following:

 Edward G. Robinson as Oscar Bromek
 Ray Walston as Lyle Partridge
 Beatrice Straight as Grace Tyburn
 Frank Conroy as John Tyburn
 Parker Fennelly as George Putnam
 Robert Webber as Malcolm Field
 John Hoyt as the Middle Selectman
 Lori March as Felicia Field
 Walter Baldwin as the Left Selectman

Production
The program aired on October 23, 1958, on the CBS television series Playhouse 90. It was written by Ernest Kinoy. Herbert Brodkin was the producer and Herbert Hirschman the director.

References

1958 American television episodes
Playhouse 90 (season 3) episodes
1958 television plays